This is a list of bus stations in Wales:

See also
Transport in Wales
List of bus stations in London
List of bus stations in Scotland

References

External links

Traveline Cymru
Bus times

 
Wales
Wales transport-related lists
Bus stations